Philemon Tei McCarthy (born 14 August 1983) is a Ghanaian professional footballer who plays as a goalkeeper for Dreams.

Club career
McCarthy was born in Accra, Ghana. He began his career with Golden Boys before joining the Feyenoord Academy in 2005. In 2008, McCarthy left Feyenoord Academy to join Accra Hearts of Oak. He was a key member of the Accra Hearts of Oak team that won the league in the 2008–09 season. McCarthy is in his second spell with the club but he has been afflicted with injuries since his return. He was the standout player in a match against Asante Kotoko in Kumasi on 15 April 2012. He dislocated his finger after a save in the game and he was not able to continue. His team lost the game 2–1 to their rivals after his substitution.

He re-joined former club Dreams during the 2017–18 season following a stint with Israeli club Hapoel Afula.

McCarthy moved to Dreams for a third time in May 2020, having agreed a three-year contract.

International career
McCarthy earned two national caps for Ghana and was a player in the squad for the African Nations Cup 2006, and returned for the 2010 African Cup of Nations. 

McCarthy was the number one goalkeeper for the local Black Stars when they won silver in the first edition of the 2009 African Nations Championship hosted by Ivory Coast in 2009. He was the hero for the Ghanaian side as his save from Papy Djilobodji paved the way for victory, which was made possible after Kwadwo Poku converted his kick.

References

External links
 
 Philemon McCarthy at Ghana Premier League

1987 births
Living people
Ghanaian footballers
Ghana international footballers
Association football goalkeepers
Accra Hearts of Oak S.C. players
West African Football Academy players
Hapoel Afula F.C. players
Dreams F.C. (Ghana) players
Liga Leumit players
Expatriate footballers in Israel
Ghanaian expatriate sportspeople in Israel
2006 Africa Cup of Nations players
2010 Africa Cup of Nations players
2009 African Nations Championship players
Ghana A' international footballers